Ben Wilson (born 25 February 1977) is a former Australian rules footballer who played with Collingwood and the Sydney Swans in the Australian Football League (AFL).

Wilson was secured by Collingwood from Norwood in the 1994 AFL Draft with the ninth selection, but first not from a TAC Cup side. The South Australian didn't feature in the 1995 AFL season and then appeared twice for Collingwood in 1996.

He was traded to Sydney at the end of 1996, along with Mark Orchard and two draft picks, for which Collingwood received Anthony Rocca. He played in the opening three rounds of the 1997 season but made only one further appearance.

Politics
Wilson was announced as  the Dignity Party candidate to represent the electorate of Dunstan in the eastern suburbs of Adelaide at the 2018 state election.

References

External links
 
 

1977 births
Australian rules footballers from South Australia
Collingwood Football Club players
Sydney Swans players
Norwood Football Club players
Living people